Dwaine R. Dillard (March 9, 1949 – June 25, 2008) was an American professional basketball player who spent one season in the American Basketball Association (ABA) with the Utah Stars during the 1975–76 season. He attended Eastern Michigan University before being drafted in the sixth round (89 overall) during the 1972 NBA draft by the Baltimore Bullets, who he never played for.

External links

1949 births
2008 deaths
American men's basketball players
Baltimore Bullets (1963–1973) draft picks
Basketball players from Nebraska
Eastern Michigan Eagles men's basketball players
Small forwards
Sportspeople from Omaha, Nebraska
Utah Stars players
Omaha Central High School alumni